Sceloporus olloporus, the southern rosebelly lizard, is a species of lizard in the family Phrynosomatidae. It is found in Guatemala, Honduras, Nicaragua, and Costa Rica.

References

Sceloporus
Reptiles described in 1937
Taxa named by Hobart Muir Smith